Aconitum sukaczevii is a species of flowering plant in the family Ranunculaceae, native to Irkutsk Oblast in Russia. It is known only from the northern slopes of the Khamar-Daban mountains.

References

sukaczevii
Endemic flora of Russia
Flora of Irkutsk Oblast
Plants described in 1937